Formalized by John Tukey, the Tukey lambda distribution is a continuous, symmetric probability distribution defined in terms of its quantile function. It is typically used to identify an appropriate distribution (see the comments below) and not used in statistical models directly.

The Tukey lambda distribution has a single shape parameter, λ, and as with other probability distributions, it can be transformed with a location parameter, μ, and a scale parameter, σ. Since the general form of probability distribution can be expressed in terms of the standard distribution, the subsequent formulas are given for the standard form of the function.

Quantile function
For the standard form of the Tukey lambda distribution, the quantile function,  (i.e. the inverse function to the cumulative distribution function) and the quantile density function ( are

For most values of the shape parameter, the probability density function (PDF) and cumulative distribution function (CDF) must be computed numerically. The Tukey lambda distribution has a simple, closed form for the CDF and / or PDF only for a few exceptional values of the shape parameter, for example:   { 2, 1, 0 } (see uniform distribution [case  = 1] and the logistic distribution [case  = 0]).

As is the usual case with statistical distributions, the Tukey lambda distribution can readily be used by looking up values in a prepared table.

Moments
The Tukey lambda distribution is symmetric around zero, therefore the expected value of this distribution is equal to zero.
 

More generally, the n-th order moment is finite when  and is expressed in terms of the beta function Β(x,y) (except when λ = 0) :
 

Note that due to symmetry of the density function, all moments of odd orders are equal to zero.

L-moments
Differently from the central moments, L-moments can be expressed in a closed form. The L-moment of order r>1 is given by

The first six L-moments can be presented as follows:

Comments
The Tukey lambda distribution is actually a family of distributions that can approximate a number of common distributions. For example,

The most common use of this distribution is to generate a Tukey lambda PPCC plot of a data set. Based on the PPCC plot, an appropriate model for the data is suggested. Values of  less than 0.14 suggests a heavier-tailed distribution; a milepost at  = 0 (logistic) would indicate quite fat tails, with the extreme limit at  = −1, approximating Cauchy. That is, as the best-fit value of  varies from 0.14 towards −1, a bell-shaped PDF with increasingly heavy tails is suggested. Similarly, for an optimal value of  becomes greater than 0.14 suggests a distribution with exceptionally thin tails (based on the point of view that the normal distribution itself is thin-tailed to begin with).

Except for values of  very close to 0, all the suggested PDF functions have finite support, between      and    .

Since the Tukey lambda distribution is a symmetric distribution, the use of the Tukey lambda PPCC plot to determine a reasonable distribution to model the data only applies to symmetric distributions. A histogram of the data should provide evidence as to whether the data can be reasonably modeled with a symmetric distribution.

References

External links

Continuous distributions
Probability distributions with non-finite variance